Chalus can refer to:

Places 

 Châlus, a commune in the Haute-Vienne département of France
 Chalus, Puy-de-Dôme, a commune in the Puy-de-Dôme département of France
 Chalus, Iran, a city in Mazandaran province of Iran
 Chalus County, an administrative subdivision of Mazandaran Province of Iran
 Chalus Road, in Iran
 Chalus River, in Iran

People 

 Matěj Chaluš, Czech footballer

See also 

 Calus (disambiguation)
 Callus (disambiguation)